The Força de Unidade Popular (FUP; Popular Unity Force), was a Portuguese political party, founded in 1980 and dissolved in 2004.

The party was founded by Otelo Saraiva de Carvalho "to promote popular unity among the Portuguese people for the construction of Socialism" and "to practice solidarity with all the peoples of the world who struggle for their liberation and by Socialism." 
In 1980, Otelo was a candidate in the Portuguese presidential elections. Otelo finished in third in the elections with 85,896 (1.4%) votes.

References

1980 establishments in Portugal
2004 disestablishments in Portugal
Defunct communist parties in Portugal
Far-left political parties
Political parties disestablished in 2004
Political parties established in 1980
Portuguese Communist Party